Deborah Taylor Tate was a Commissioner of the Federal Communications Commission (FCC).  She was nominated by President George W. Bush on November 9, 2005, for the remainder of the term expiring June 30, 2007. She was unanimously confirmed by the United States Senate on December 21, 2005, and sworn in as FCC Commissioner on January 3, 2006.  She has spoken out in favor of Digital Rights Management and suggested TV may be a contributing factor in childhood obesity.

In April 2007, the Center for Public Integrity reported that Tate, a Nashville, Tennessee native, received talking points on how to best oppose the pending merger between satellite radio firms XM and Sirius from a representative of Clear Channel, a terrestrial radio company opposing the deal.

On December 30, 2008, the FCC announced that Tate would be resigning from office. In June 2009, President Obama nominated Mignon Clyburn to take her place.

References

External links
Official homepage at FCC

Slashdot article re support of DRM

Year of birth missing (living people)
Living people
Members of the Federal Communications Commission
George W. Bush administration personnel
Members of the Junior League